The Sidi Ibrahim El Desouki Mosque, better known as El Ibrahimi Mosque, is the largest mosque in Desouk, Egypt. It contains the tomb of Ibrahim El-Desouki.

See also

 Desouki
  Lists of mosques 
  List of mosques in Africa
  List of mosques in Egypt

Mosques in Egypt
Sufi mosques
Sufism in Egypt
Desouk
Mosque buildings with domes